Carol Turney (born 26 June 1955) is a Canadian basketball player. She competed in the women's tournament at the 1976 Summer Olympics. She was a member of the Canadian team that won the bronze medal at the 1979 Pan American Games.

Awards and honors
Top 100 U Sports women's basketball Players of the Century (1920-2020).
Class of 2017 Victoria Vikes Hall of Fame Inductee

References

1955 births
Living people
Basketball people from Ontario
Canadian women's basketball players
Olympic basketball players of Canada
Basketball players at the 1976 Summer Olympics
Sportspeople from Cornwall, Ontario
UBC Thunderbirds basketball players
Pan American Games bronze medalists for Canada
Pan American Games medalists in basketball
Basketball players at the 1979 Pan American Games
Medalists at the 1979 Pan American Games